Chitterkote is a small village in tehsil Karnah in Kupwara district in the Indian union territory of Jammu and Kashmir.

Geography
It is located in Karnah Valley between Chamkote and Gundi Syedian village just below Danna Mountain. It is in a remote area and remains isolated from Jammu and Kashmir for two months each winter due to avalanches at the Sadhna Pass and Shams Bri mountain ranges.

Demographics
Chitterkote's population exceeds 1,200, with more than 129 houses. The village has a very healthy sex ratio of 997:1000. The village has a 30-bed hospital, a branch of Jammu and Kashmir Bank etc. The villagers are economically poor and less educated.

Education
There is a Government Boys Middle School for boys and a separate school for girls as Government Girls Middle School. There is two  privately run school known as New Light Public Model  School and Karnah Valley Public school  Chitterkote. The literacy rate of the village is below the national rate.

Transportation

Air
The nearest airport is Srinagar International Airport located 170 kilometres from Chitterkote.

Rail
The nearest railway station is Baramulla railway station located 115 kilometres from Chitterkote.

Road
Chitterkote is connected to other places in Jammu and Kashmir and India by the NH 701 which passes through the Karnah tehsil.

See also
Teetwal
Kupwara district
Karnah
Tangdhar

References

External links
 

Villages in Kupwara district